Community youth workers are young people and adults who are engaged in education, empowerment, activism, or other activities focused on adolescents in community-based settings, including churches, schools, or community centers. As a distinct field, community youth work, (often just called youth work), has been established in the United States since the early 20th century. Youth organizations including the YMCA, Boy Scouts, and 4-H set the early standard for youth work. Many believe they were simply following the principles of organizations in the United Kingdom. Since that time a plethora of groups have become active, leading advocacy, research, and education about community youth work around the world.

See also

 Community youth development
 Positive youth development
 Youth voice
 Civic engagement
 Volunteerism
 Youth work
 Youth leaders

References

External links 
 Informal Education Encyclopedia

Youth work